The National Optical Astronomy Observatory (NOAO) was the United States national observatory for ground-based nighttime ultraviolet-optical-infrared (OUVIR) astronomy. The National Science Foundation (NSF) funded NOAO to provide forefront astronomical research facilities for US astronomers. Professional astronomers from any country in the world could apply to use the telescopes operated by NOAO under the NSF's "open skies" policy.

NOAO was operated by the Association of Universities for Research in Astronomy (AURA) under a cooperative agreement with the NSF. Its headquarters in Tucson, Arizona, were co-located with the headquarters of the National Solar Observatory. The budget for NOAO during the 2017 fiscal year was nearly $23 million.

NOAO was founded in 1984 to join the operations of the Kitt Peak National Observatory in the United States with the Cerro Tololo Inter-American Observatory in Chile. On October 1, 2019, NOAO merged its operations with the Gemini Observatory and the Vera C. Rubin Observatory to form NSF's NOIRLab.

Telescopes 
NOAO operated world class research telescopes in both the northern and southern hemispheres. These telescopes, located at Kitt Peak and Cerro Tololo in the US and Chile respectively, remain in operation under the auspices of the NSF’s NOIRLab. The two sites allow US astronomers to make observations over the entire sky. Instrumentation includes optical to near infrared wavelength (0.4 to 5 micrometers) cameras and spectrometers.

Cerro Tololo Inter-American Observatory (CTIO)

CTIO has a base and office facility in the seaside town of La Serena, Chile. The CTIO telescopes are located some 70 km inland in the foothills of the Chilean Andes. Access to the observatory is made through the picturesque Elqui Valley.

Telescopes at CTIO include the Victor M. Blanco Telescope (named after astronomer Victor Manuel Blanco in 1995) which employs a wide-field of view CCD (Charge-coupled device), a wide field of view near infrared imager (1-2.5 micrometers) and a multi-object fiber fed spectrograph working at visible wavelengths.

The Blanco 4m played the central role in the discovery of dark energy, a poorly understood component to the universe which is currently causing the universe to accelerate in its expansion. The Blanco began hosting a new 3-degree field of view camera called the Dark Energy Camera, also known as DECam, in 2012. This camera is being built at Fermilab in Chicago, USA, and will be operated by CTIO. This instrument was built to execute the Dark Energy Survey, an undertaking to image a large part of the sky to faint light levels, detecting galaxy large scale structure as a function of look back time to shed light on the nature of dark energy.

CTIO operates, and is a partner in the 4.1m Southern Astrophysical Research Telescope (SOAR). SOAR concentrates on high angular resolution observations and will soon deploy an adaptive optics module to help support such observations.

Kitt Peak National Observatory (KPNO)

KPNO is located near Tucson, Arizona, US. The mountain, Kitt Peak, is part of the tribal lands of the Native American people the Tohono O'odham. The mountain has been leased from the Tohono O'odham since 1958. The native name for the mountain is "loligam" which means manzanita.

The observatory was established in 1958, and its largest telescope, the Nicholas Mayall 4m was dedicated in 1973. The Mayall played a key role in the discovery of dark matter though observations of external galaxies which showed that the galaxies rotated faster than they should have if the motion were due only to the mass in stars seen in visible light images.

A new wide field imager working at near infrared wavelengths (NEWFIRM) has been deployed to advance studies of galactic star formation, cosmology, and the structure and evolution of galaxies.

NOAO Gemini Science Center (NGSC)
NOAO also manages US participation in the international Gemini Observatory. Gemini is a partnership of Argentina, Australia, Brazil, Canada, the United Kingdom, and the United States. The US holds a 50% share of the project (funded by the NSF) which provides public access time on each of Gemini's two 8m telescopes. One telescope is located near CTIO in Chile, and the other is located on the island of Hawaii.

Gemini is the only facility available to all US astronomers on a permanent basis for large aperture science. Large apertures are typically taken to be between 6.5m and 10m. Gemini provides near infrared, mid infrared (10–20 micrometer), and optical imaging and spectroscopy in both the southern and northern hemispheres.

One of Gemini's strengths is high angular resolution imaging accomplished through laser guide star adaptive optics. These facilities are already making an impact. For example, Gemini astronomers, along with their collaborators at the 10m W. M. Keck Observatory, recently announced the first images of an extra solar system with three detected planets circling their parent star, an A-type star known as HR 8799.

Vera C. Rubin Observatory (LSST survey) 

NOAO was a founding partner in the Vera C. Rubin Observatory project. Rubin Observatory is an 8m class telescope which will change the way some astronomers do science. More like a large physics program, Rubin Observatory will run its own experiment and provide data to the Rubin Observatory community in the form of images and astronomical catalogs. Rubin Observatory will have a dedicated wide field imager, and the telescope will cover the entire sky visible from the southern hemisphere approximately every week. By repeating the observations over and over for ten years, the Rubin Observatory will produce a very deep image of the sky, but it will also detect large numbers of astronomical objects which vary in brightness daily or on longer time scales. Rubin Observatory scientists will analyze, or "mine", the LSST data rather than go to the telescope to make their own observations.

Rubin Observatory is currently in the pre-construction phase, with first light targeted for 2023. During this phase, AURA is managing for design and development of the Rubin Observatory telescope system and site facilities. Rubin Observatory will be located on Cerro Pachón in Chile, near the Gemini and SOAR telescopes. It will be operated by NOIRLab and SLAC National Accelerator Laboratory. 

At the beginning of the new millennium, the National Academy of Sciences published its report on Astronomy and Astrophysics in the coming decade. Among other high priorities, the committee responsible for the report concluded:

NOAO has worked very hard with the US community in the ensuing years in developing this System. A clear success story is the public access to non-federal large aperture telescopes through the NSF funded and NOAO managed Telescope System Instrumentation Program (TSIP). This program, accomplished with the enthusiastic support of the US non federal observatories, supplies the broad US community with some 70 nights of observing time per year.

This System goal was further reiterated by the NSF Senior Review in 2007 when it reviewed the full suite of NSF ground-based astronomy facilities. NOAO continued to work on behalf of the community to effectively shape the System and gain steady, state-of-the-art research capabilities of all apertures for open, merit based science.

A future major capability for the US system is an Extremely Large Telescope with diameter up to 30 meters. Two private consortia are currently working on such projects which may be operational before the end of the decade. These are the Thirty Meter Telescope and Giant Magellan Telescope. NOAO was working with both projects in planning for potential future involvement of the broad US community through operational support funding by the NSF.

See also
 Other Optical Observatories in Chile
 Europe's Very Large Telescope & La Silla Observatory
 Carnegie Institution of Washington's Las Campanas Observatory
 The Magellan telescopes
 Other Optical Observatories in Arizona
 The Large Binocular Telescope
 The Lowell Observatory
 The MMT Observatory
 The Steward Observatory
 World Wide Observatories
 List of observatories

References

External links
 AURA
 https://www.nsf.gov/dir/index.jsp?org=MPS

Astronomical observatories in Arizona
Astronomical observatories in Chile
National Science Foundation
Buildings and structures in Tucson, Arizona